Industry Dive is an online business to business news source, with an estimated 13 million readers across more than 25 industries, from banking to waste management.

In July 2022, Falfurrias Capital Partners sold Industry Dive to Informa plc for approximately $530 million.

Overview

According to Folio magazine, Industry Dive's business model targets busy executives using their mobile phones.  ID has reported revenues of $30 million to $60 million. Most of its revenues come from its core advertising business. Industry Dive has more than 300 employees, including 80 journalists and 12 engineers, and its headquarters is in Washington, DC.

History
Industry Dive was formed in 2012 by Sean Griffey (president), Eli Dickinson (chief technology officer) and Ryan Willumson (chief revenue officer) and funded with $900,000 from private investors in 2012 and 2013. The company started by covering five industries: construction, education, marketing, utility and waste.

In 2016, it began its Dive Awards to recognize the most innovative and disruptive businesses. Industry Dive's revenues quadrupled from 2015 to 2018, putting it in the top half of the Deloitte Technology Fast 500 and the top 20 percent of the Inc top 5000 list. In 2019, Falfurrias Capital Partners acquired a majority stake in the company. ID's content marketing clients included IBM, Siemens and UPS.

In 2020, DCA Live named Industry Dive to its "Red Hot Companies" list, which recognizes the Washington DC area's fastest-growing companies. In the same year, Industry Dive acquired CFO.com.

In 2020, Industry Dive acquired CFO. In 2021, Industry Dive acquired PharmaVOICE.

Journalism awards
The American Society of Business Publication Editors has awarded several national and regional Awards of Excellence to Industry Dive publications, including for a series of articles in 2020 about Big Pharma and the race for the coronavirus vaccine.

Workplace Awards
The Washington Post has recognized Industry Dive as a top place to work for four consecutive years, from 2016 to 2020.

See also 
Business to Business
Digital journalism
Online journalism

References

External links 
 Official Website

Digital media

Technology in society
2019 mergers and acquisitions
2022 mergers and acquisitions